Xintian County is a county of Hunan Province, China, it is under the administration of the prefecture-level city of Yongzhou.

Located on the southern part of the province and the west of Yongzhou, the county is bordered to the north by Qiyang County and Changning City, to the east by Guiyang County, to the southeast by Jiahe County, to the southwest and the west by Ningyuan County. The county has 11  towns and a townships under its jurisdiction, the county seat is Longquan.

Administrative divisions
11 towns
 Dapingtang
 Jiantou
 Jicun
 Jinling
 Jinpen
 Longquan
 Sanjing
 Shiyang
 Taoling
 Xinlong
 Xinxu

1 Yao ethnic township
 Yao Menlouxia

Climate

References
www.xzqh.org

External links 

 
County-level divisions of Hunan
Yongzhou